The Amendolea (Greek: Ποταμός Αμεντολέα from Greek "αμυγδαλέα" (=αμυγδαλιά)) is a river in the province of Reggio Calabria in the Calabria region of southern Italy. Its source is near Montalto in Aspromonte National Park. The river flows south past Roghudi and Condofuri and empties into the Ionian sea west of Bova Marina.

References

Rivers of the Province of Reggio Calabria
Rivers of Italy
Drainage basins of the Ionian Sea